Vasilchuki is a rural locality (a selo) in Klyuchevsky District, Altai Krai, Russia. The population was 1,154 as of 2016. There are 10 streets.

Geography 
Vasilchuki is located 16 km west of Klyuchi (the district's administrative centre) by road. Klyuchi is the nearest rural locality.

References 

Rural localities in Klyuchevsky District